Cristiano Spirito (born 12 January 1992) is an Italian footballer who plays for Vigor Lamezia, on loan from Parma.

Biography
Born in Rome, Lazio, Spirito started his career at Lazio. In mid-2011 Spirito was signed by the fourth division club Melfi on free transfer, where he played two seasons. Spirito also received call-up from Italy Lega Pro under-20 representative team. He played once against Croatia U20.

On 11 July 2013 Spirito was signed by the third division club Savona via Parma. On 14 January 2014 he was signed by San Marino Calcio.

On 8 July 2014 he was signed by Vigor Lamezia in temporary deal.

References

External links
 AIC profile (data by football.it) 

Italian footballers
S.S. Lazio players
A.S. Melfi players
Savona F.B.C. players
A.S.D. Victor San Marino players
Serie C players
Association football defenders
Footballers from Rome
1992 births
Living people